A phreatic eruption, also called a phreatic explosion, ultravulcanian eruption or steam-blast eruption, occurs when magma heats ground water or surface water. The extreme temperature of the magma (anywhere from ) causes near-instantaneous evaporation of water to steam, resulting in an  explosion of steam, water, ash, rock, and volcanic bombs. At Mount St. Helens in Washington state, hundreds of steam explosions preceded the 1980 Plinian eruption of the volcano. A less intense  geothermal event may result in a mud volcano. 

Phreatic eruptions typically include steam and rock fragments; the inclusion of liquid lava is unusual. The temperature of the fragments can range from cold to incandescent. If molten magma is included, volcanologists classify the event as a  phreatomagmatic eruption. These eruptions occasionally create broad, low-relief  craters called maars. Phreatic explosions can be accompanied by carbon dioxide or hydrogen sulfide gas-emissions. Carbon dioxide can asphyxiate at sufficient concentration; hydrogen sulfide acts as a broad-spectrum poison. A 1979 phreatic eruption on the island of Java killed 140 people, most of whom were overcome by poisonous gases.

Examples of phreatic eruptions

 Cumbre Vieja - In the 2021 La Palma eruption, new eruptive vents tended to announce themselves with a phreatic explosion, followed soon after by the opening of a new fissure vent in the same location.
 Krakatoa – Indonesia, 1883 (see 1883 eruption of Krakatoa) – it is believed that the eruption, which obliterated most of the volcanic island and created the loudest sound in recorded history, was a phreatomagmatic event.
Ritter Island – Papua New Guinea, 1888 (see 1888 Ritter Island eruption and tsunami) – Resulted in the largest lateral spreading of a volcanic cone in human history.
 Kilauea – Hawaii, United States – the volcano has a long record of phreatic explosions; a 1924 phreatic eruption hurled rocks estimated at eight tons up to a distance of one kilometer.
 Surtsey – Iceland, 1963–65
 Taal Volcano – Philippines, 1965, 1977, 2020
 Mount Ontake – Japan, 2014 (see 2014 Mount Ontake eruption)
 Mayon Volcano – Philippines, 2013
 Whakaari/White Island – New Zealand, 2019 (see 2019 Whakaari/White Island eruption)
 Mount Bulusan – Philippines, 2022
 Taal Volcano - Philippines, 2020

See also

References 

 
Volcanic eruption types